Worthington Valley Historic District is a national historic district in Reisterstown, Baltimore County, Maryland, United States. It is a largely rural district where the earliest standing structures date from the very end of the 18th century. Horse breeding and racing is a very large and lucrative business in the valley. Since 1922, Snow Hill and Worthington Farms have been the scene of the Maryland Hunt Cup Steeplechase.  Located next to it is the Western Run–Belfast Road Historic District.

It was added to the National Register of Historic Places in 1976.

References

External links
, including photo dated 1976, at Maryland Historical Trust
Boundary Map of the Worthington Valley Historic District, Baltimore County, at Maryland Historical Trust

Historic districts in Baltimore County, Maryland
Greek Revival architecture in Maryland
Neoclassical architecture in Maryland
Historic districts on the National Register of Historic Places in Maryland
Reisterstown, Maryland
National Register of Historic Places in Baltimore County, Maryland